Behtiyar Memetimin (born 27 August 1998) is a Chinese footballer currently playing as a midfielder for Xinjiang Tianshan Leopard.

Career statistics

Club
.

References

1998 births
Living people
Chinese footballers
Association football midfielders
China League One players
Xinjiang Tianshan Leopard F.C. players